Elizabeth Geary McIntyre (born April 5, 1965), sometimes known as Liz McIntyre, is an American freestyle skier and Olympic medalist. She received a silver medal at the 1994 Winter Olympics in Lillehammer, in moguls. She finished 8th at the 1998 Winter Olympics in Nagano.

McIntyre was born in Hanover, New Hampshire.

References

1965 births
Living people
American female freestyle skiers
Freestyle skiers at the 1992 Winter Olympics
Freestyle skiers at the 1994 Winter Olympics
Freestyle skiers at the 1998 Winter Olympics
Olympic silver medalists for the United States in freestyle skiing
Medalists at the 1994 Winter Olympics
21st-century American women